Annie DiRusso is an American indie rock musician based in Nashville, Tennessee.

History
DiRusso released her first two songs, Gone/Blue Walls, in 2017. DiRusso's third song was released in 2018 titled Dead Dogs. DiRusso released her fourth song in 2018 titled Don't Swerve.  Also in 2018, DiRusso released a song titled "Jonathan". DiRusso released her song 20 in 2020. In Late 2020, DiRusso released a new song called Judgements From The World’s Greatest Band. DiRusso released her latest song, Nine Months, in 2021. The song became a viral hit on the app TikTok.

References

American indie rock musicians